In molecular biology, gem-associated protein (GEMIN) may refer to:

 Gem-associated protein 2
 Gem-associated protein 3
 Gem-associated protein 4
 Gem-associated protein 5
 Gem-associated protein 6
 Gem-associated protein 7
 Gem-associated protein 8